George Ilenikhena (born 16 August 2006) is a french nigerian professional footballer who plays as a forward for Ligue 2 club Amiens.

Early life 
George Ilenikhena was born in Lagos, Nigeria, from Nigerian parents, but he arrived in France aged only 3, growing up in Antony, Hauts-de-Seine.

Club career 
Having made his way through all of the youth levels of the amateur Antony Football Evolution, George Ilenikhena joined the professional club of Amiens that was just relegated in Ligue 2, for the 2021–22 season.

During that season he scored a total of 24 goals for the under-17 national side, also playing and scoring in the Coupe Gambardella. This soon draw the attention from big clubs in France and Abroad during the summer 2022, while he was still just aged 15.

Ilenikhena made his professional debut for the Amiens SC on the 19 November 2022, during a 10–0 home Coupe de France win to the Aiglon du Lamentin. He came on as a substitute for Jérémy Gelin, as his side was already 8–0 up.

Having fully moved from the youth teams to the National 3 reserve team, Ilenikhena still kept on training regularly with the first team, even making his first assist in December 2022 during a friendly game against FUS Rabat.

International career 
George Ilenikhena first featured with France youth teams on the summer 2021, as he was selected with the Under-16, along the likes of Warren Zaïre-Emery.

Style of play 
Ilenikhena is a quick centre-forward, Philippe Hinschberger, the coach of his debut with Amiens, describes him as a strong left-footed player, with an outstanding ability to attack the depth of the field.

He mentioned Cristiano Ronaldo and Kylian Mbappé as his two favorite players.

References

External links

2006 births
Living people
Sportspeople from Lagos
Nigerian footballers
French footballers
French people of Nigerian descent
Black French sportspeople
Association football forwards
Amiens SC players
Championnat National 3 players
Ligue 2 players